LieutenantColonel JamesHannaMcCormick, (September1875 – May1955)  was a professional soldier and UlsterUnionistParty politician.

Early life
McCormick was born in Belfast,Ireland to ThomasMcCormick and ElizabethHannaMcCormick. He self-described his religion as "IrishProtestant".

He moved to Canada in 1903, to take part in the colonisation of Lloydminster, Saskatchewan.

By 1909, he had become the deputy mayor of Lloydminster, where he also owned 1,200 acres of land and worked as an estate auctioneer.

Military career

Early career

McCormick served in the BoerWar in the ImperialYeomanry, and later joined the 22ndSaskatchewan LightHorse of the Canadian militia.

First World War

At the outbreak of the FirstWorldWar, McCormick enlisted as a commissioned officer in the CanadianExpeditionaryForce. As the deputysheriff of Saskatchewan, he raised a band of men at his own expense - the CorpsofWesternCanadianCowboys, nicknamed "McCormick'sDevils". They joined the 197thBattalion (later absorbed into the 11thBattalion) and crossed the Atlantic in January1917.

In August1917, he led the 17th (City of Winnipeg) Battalion during the final assault on Lens. He won the Distinguished Service Order medal for his actions at Vimy Ridge. He had been recommended for the Victoria Cross and was wounded five times throughout the war.

He returned to Canada in October 1919.

Political career

After the war, McCormick returned to Belfast to pursue a political career in the newly partitioned government of NorthernIreland.

He was the chairman of the CourtofAppeal from 1921 to 1924, and of the appealcourts of the MinistryofLabour from 1928 to 1929.

Member of Parliament

In 1929, McCormick campaigned as the UlsterUnionistParty candidate for BelfastStAnne's in the NorthernIreland HouseofCommons. Following a successful campaign, he became the new constituency's first member of parliament.

Anti-Catholicism
Despite his senior position in the UUP, he became a leading member of the controversial anti-Catholic UlsterProtestantLeague during its formation in 1931. He also travelled to Scotland to speak on behalf of its sister organisation, the Scottish Protestant League.

In 1933, he complained about Protestants giving jobs to Catholics, accusing those that did of being "traitors" to their country.

McCormick was also alarmed at the rate of population growth of the Catholic demographic. At an Orangemen rally, he proclaimed that some Protestant majorities had become minorities, saying that could lead to the Catholic Church being in power.

Shooting

In October 1933, McCormick was attacked by two assailants outside his home. After defending himself with his walking stick, he was shot in the arm. The press linked the incident to Irish republicanism, of which McCormick was a well-known opponent.

Later life

In 1938, at the end of his second term, McCormick retired from political office.

He renamed his house to Vimy, after the battle in which he was decorated for gallantry.

He was nominated as an independent unionist candidate for Belfast West in the 1950 UK general election, but the seat was won by James Godfrey MacManaway of the UUP. In a column for the Londonderry Sentinel, MacManaway accused McCormick of splitting the vote, saying he wasn't a unionist "of any kind".

McCormick continued to reside in NorthernIreland until his death in 1955.

Publications
McCormick authored two books about the colonisation of Saskatchewan:
The Greater Saskatchewan (1910)
Lloydminster, or 5,000 miles with the Barr Colonists (1924)

Notes

References

Ulster Unionist Party members of the House of Commons of Northern Ireland
Members of the House of Commons of Northern Ireland 1929–1933
Members of the House of Commons of Northern Ireland 1933–1938
Members of the House of Commons of Northern Ireland for Belfast constituencies
Companions of the Distinguished Service Order
Canadian Expeditionary Force officers
People from Lloydminster
1875 births
1955 deaths